The Switzerland men's national volleyball team is the volleyball national team of Switzerland. It takes part in international volleyball competitions.

Result history

European Championship
  1971 Switzerland — 19th place

Team

Current roster
The following is the Switzerland roster for the 2017 Men's European Championship qualifiers.

Head Coach: Dario Bettello

References

External links

National men's volleyball teams
Volleyball in Switzerland
V